is an off-campus, public facility located outside of Sanda, Hyōgo, Japan that is operated by Kwansei Gakuin University. About 12,000 people visit Sengari Camp a year. Half of them are connected to Kwansei Gakuin University, for example, kindergarten children, junior high school, high school, and university students in the Kwansei Gakuin group. 25% are associated with Christianity in some way, and there are two Chapels for this purpose. The rest of the guests are from the general public. Most guests stay one or two days. Many people visit the camp in July and August. Sengari camp was created in 1955 and this camp's aim is a connection between the forest and human life. Usually employees work full season, but in long vacation, camp leaders, who are Kwansei Gakuin university students, work as volunteers there.

Location and access map

Sengari Camp is located at 1817-1 Kashita, Sanda, Hyōgo, 669-1507, Japan

Access to Sengari Camp

Bus from Sanda station (about 20 minutes)

Bus from Takarazuka station

On-site facilities

Sengari has new cabins, old cabins, and tents as accommodations. There are also three meeting rooms, two Japanese-style rooms, two guest rooms and a cafeteria. In addition, there is a staffed office. For outdoor meetings, four facilities are available. Guests can use campfire places and sports grounds as well.

The Camp Center is the main lodge. There are three workshop rooms, two Japanese-style rooms, two guest rooms, one cafeteria, one room for camp leaders, two bathes and six bathrooms in the main lodge. The Camp Center is handicap accessible.

There several other facilities located in Sengari Camp that can be used for various purposes. “Shalom Hall", which is a monument of the Great Hanshin earthquake, can be used as an assembly hall and for doing campfires inside. Three meeting places are “Outerbridge Hall”, “Tsuji Memorial Chapel”, and the “Log House”. "Outerbridge Hall" has an organ, blackboard, some desks and chairs. Outerbridge Hall's capacity is about 100 people. "Tsuji Memorial Chapel" has an organ and the floor is concrete. Tsuji Chapel's capacity is about 120 people. This chapel is used for doing campfires with candles, and making handcrafts. The "Log House" has a refrigerator, heater, bookshelves and some books. The log house's capacity is about 20 people. Three outdoor facilities are “Green Chapel”, “Grace Hill” and the grounds.  Green chapel is the open-air chapel with 15 benches. It is found near "Praying Hill", an outdoor praying space near a big pond, where crayfish fishing is permitted. Near this pond there are many flowers. Five campfires places are Dai-ichi campfires place, Dai-ni campfires place, the “Pole Sight”, the "Coliseum", and the “Diamond Stage”. The Pole Sight is a small area often used for doing hangousuisan, a Japanese way of cooking rice above a campfire. The Coloseum is used for playing many sports like baseball, soccer, and badminton, and it must be reserved before use. The Diamond Stage is used for doing campfires. The playground has some handmade equipment such as a slide and swing. Suisanjyou resembles the Pole Sight but is smaller. Additionally, the "Tent Site" is a space to pitch tents.

Staff
There are full-time staff, part-time staff and student leaders. The full-time staff consists of two managers, four clerks and two kitchen staff. Their work is to manage the camp, to take reservations and to cook. The part-time staff's work is cleaning and helping the kitchen staff.

Student leaders are students of Kwansei Gakuin University. They call visitor campers. They get up at 6:30 and open the various facilities. They give orientations and explain the ways to use the camp. Sometimes they raise the flag. Their main job is preparing meals and helping campers make campfires. The student leaders also cut trees and grasses for safely. The challenge of this job is to practice the spirit of ‘Mastery for Service’ and the growth of oneself. They work for camper's enjoyment.
The work force consists of a full-time staff and part-time staff of 20 people and 18 Student leaders.

Visitors

Approximately 12,000 visitors come in a year. Summer is the most popular season to visit.

Famous visitors

 Prince Mikasa of the Imperial House of Japan
 Ekizo Fujibayashi (藤林益三 ) (Chief Justice of the Supreme Court)
Former U.S. President Jimmy Carter

Sengari SciTech English Camp

Sengari SciTech English Camp (千刈科学技術英語合宿) started in 2004. Approximately 60-70 science students from Kwansei Gakuin University take part in this course for 5 days during summer vacation (with an additional 2 days on-campus). The students are separated into small groups, and each group has a native English teacher and 8~9 students. The main purpose of this course is to provide intensive English opportunities for students. Teachers try to make students work harder so that students can learn about Science in English and Science ethics.

References
Sengari Camp Nature Guide Map, Ezo Azuma. (Date unknown). Sengari Camp Materials.
Campers First, Ken Okumura. (Date unknown). Sengari Camp Materials.
Official site (Japanese): Sengari Camp

External links
 Official site (Japanese): Sengari Camp
 For more images, see :Category:Images of Sengari Camp.

Tourist attractions in Hyōgo Prefecture
Buildings and structures in Hyōgo Prefecture
Education in Hyōgo Prefecture